Giovanni Pérez (born 14 October 1974 in San Cristóbal) was a Venezuelan ex-football midfielder and was the head coach of Deportivo Táchira Futbol Club, who made a total number of 52 appearances for the Venezuela national team between 1997 and 2007.

Club career
He started his professional career at Deportivo Pasto in Colombia.

Head coach career
On December 03th 2019, Deportivo Tachira press department announces him as their new head coach for the up coming 2019 Venezuelan First Division, until season's end.

References

External links

Biografía tiene 1 hijos 1 llamado Giovanni Ronaldo Pérez Ochoa

1974 births
Living people
Venezuelan footballers
Venezuela international footballers
Association football midfielders
2001 Copa América players
Deportivo Pasto footballers
Deportivo Italia players
Estudiantes de Mérida players
UA Maracaibo players
Deportivo Táchira F.C. players
Caracas FC players
Zamora FC players
Expatriate footballers in Colombia
Venezuelan expatriate sportspeople in Colombia
People from San Cristóbal, Táchira